Noel G. Da Costa (24 December 1929 – 29 April 2002) was a Nigerian-Jamaican composer, jazz violinist, and choral conductor.

Early life and educational career
Noel Da Costa was born on 24 December 1929 Lagos, Nigeria to parents from Kingston, Jamaica, who were Salvation Army missionaries. After returning to Jamaica while Da Costa was young, they emigrated to New York City, living in Harlem. It was here that he started violin lessons with Barnabas Istok at the age of 11. While in High School, he was inspired by one of his teachers to work in an artistic field.

Da Costa completed his Bachelor's at Queens College in 1952 and his Master's in theory and composition at Columbia University in 1956, studying with Otto Luening and Jack Beeson. He studied with Luigi Dallapiccola in Florence, Italy under a Fulbright Fellowship, and shortly thereafter in 1961 took positions teaching at Hampton University and the City University of New York. In 1970 he accepted a position at Rutgers University, where he taught until 2001. He died the following year at the age of 72.

Musical career
Da Costa was also a co-founder of the Society of Black Composers. He was an accomplished violinist, playing his own works as well as both classical and jazz music; he played on albums by Les McCann, Roland Kirk, Bernard Purdie, Roberta Flack, McCoy Tyner, Donny Hathaway, Felix Cavaliere, Willis Jackson, Eddie Kendricks, and others. His first music set to poetry being Tambourines by Langston Hughes. He also worked with choral groups, becoming the director of the Triad Choral in 1974, and played with both Symphony of the New World and several orchestras on Broadway theatre productions.

Da Costa's works are marked by an infusion of elements of jazz, Caribbean music, and African music into the framework of Western classical music. The New York Times has described his music as "conservatively chromatic." As well as exploring Caribbean musical traditions and black American spirituals Da Costa also explored freely atonal music and serialism, as seen in his Five Verses/With Vamps (1968), Occurrence for Six (1965) and Four Preludes (1973) for trombone and piano.

Among DaCosta's students is Nkeiru Okoye.

Personal life   
Da Costa was married to his wife Patricia, with whom he had a son and a daughter.

Discography

As sideman
 Ray Bryant, MCMLXX (Atlantic, 1970)
 Carol Douglas, Come into My Life (Midland, 1979)
 Felix Cavaliere, Felix Cavaliere (Bearsville, 1974)
 Roberta Flack, Chapter Two (Atlantic, 1970)
 Willis Jackson, Plays with Feeling (Cotillion, 1976)
 Eddie Kendricks, Vintage '78 (Arista 1978)
 Webster Lewis, On the Town (Epic, 1976)
 Les McCann, Much Les (Atlantic, 1969)
 Van McCoy, Soul Improvisations (Buddah, 1972)
 Gwen McCrae, Gwen McCrae (Atlantic, 1981)
 Bernard Purdie, Soul Is... Pretty Purdie (Flying Dutchman, 1972)
 Lou Rawls, Now Is the Time (Epic, 1982)
 Ray, Goodman & Brown, Ray, Goodman & Brown II (Polydor, 1980)
 Ray, Goodman & Brown, Stay (Polydor, 1981)
 Archie Shepp, The Cry of My People (Impulse!, 1973)
 Sister Sledge, Circle of Love (ATCO, 1975)
 Charles Tolliver, Impact (1972)
 The Tymes, Diggin' Their Roots (RCA Victor, 1977)
 McCoy Tyner, Song of the New World (Milestone, 1973)
 Sadao Watanabe, Rendezvous (Elektra, 1984)

Works

Dramatic 
 The Cocktail Sip (op, 1, T. Brewster), 1958
 Dreamer Behind the Garden Gate (P. Da Costa), 1991
 Wakeupworld (C. Cullen), 1991
 3 theatre pieces for children (1971–4)
 3 film scores (1975–86)

Vocal

Choral 
 Little Lamb (Da Costa, after W. Blake: The Lamb), SATB, 1952
 Let Down the Bars O Death (E. Dickinson), SSATB, 1957
 We Are Climbing Jacob's Ladder (spiritual), arr. SAATBB, 1962
 The Last Judgement (J.W. Johnson), narrator, SSA, piano, percussion, 1964
 2 Shaker Songs (Lord's Prayer), SATB, 1964
 2 Prayers of Kierkegaard (S. Kierkegaard), SA, children's chorus, organ, 1966
 The Confession Stone (cant., O. Dodson), S, SSA, instrumental ensemble, piano, 1969
 Five/Seven, SSA, organ, 1969
 Counterpoint (Dodson), S, A, T, B, SSATB, organs (2) piano, 1970
 Tambourines (L. Hughes), children's chorus, piano, bass guitar, 1970
 I Have a Dream (M.L. King), SATB, orchestra or organ, 1971
 O God of Light and Love (G. Bass), 1971
 A Ceremony of Spirituals, S, chorus, soprano and tenor saxophone, orchestra, 1976
 Sermon on the Warpland (G. Brooks), narrator, Tenor, Baritone, chorus, organ, 1979
 Generations (P. Da Costa), narrator, dancers, chorus, percussion, 1985
 Second Sermon on the Warpland (Brooks), narrator, solo vv, chorus, piano, 1989

Solo 
 2 Songs (L. Hughes), Soprano, piano, 1955
 5 Epitaphs (C. Cullen), Soprano, string quartet, 1956
 In the Landscape of Spring (Zen Rinzai poems), Mezzo soprano, instrumental ensemble, 1962, rev. 1963
 4 Glimpses of Night (F. Marshall), Baritone, instrumental ensemble, 1964
 4 Haiku Settings (Kobayashi Issa, Taigi, Ryota, Chine Jo), Soprano, piano, 1964
 Vocalise, S, 1972
 Beyond the Years (P.L. Dunbar), Soprano, organ, 1973
 My People (Hughes), Mezzo soprano, piano, 1974
 November Song (concert scene, Brooks), Soprano, violin, sax, piano, 1974
 Prayer of Steel (C. Sandburg), Baritone, piano, 1975
 Dream Thoughts (Hughes), Tenor, piano, 1982
 In the Quiet of …, vocalise, Soprano, viola, vibraphone, 1985
 Blues Lyrics (R. Patterson), Bass-Baritone, piano, 1989–90

Instrumental Ensemble 
 Generata, organ, string orchestra, 1958
 Epigrams, instrumental ensemble, 1965
 Occurrence for Six, instrumental ensemble, 1965
 5 Verses/With Vamps, cello, piano, 1968
 Blue Mix, solo db/electric bass, cello, double bass, percussion, 1970
 Quietly … Vamp It and Tag It, orchestra, 1971
 Time … On and On, Soprano, violin, tenor sax, tape, 1971
 Jes' Grew, violin, electric piano, 1973
 4 Preludes, trombone, piano, 1973
 Magnolia Blue, violin, piano, 1975
 Ukom Memory Songs, organ, percussion, 1981
 Primal Rites, drum, orchestra, 1983
 Blue Memories, orchestra, 1987

Solo 
 Maryton, org, 1955
 Silver Blue, flute, 1966
 3 Short Pieces, alto flute, 1968
 Chili'-Lo, organ, 1971
 Triptich, organ, 1973
 Spiritual Set, organ, 1974

Reference list

Works cited

1929 births
2002 deaths
20th-century violinists
20th-century male musicians
20th-century classical composers
Jamaican expatriates in Nigeria
Emigrants from British Jamaica to the United States
Jazz violinists
Male classical composers
Male jazz musicians
Musicians from Lagos
MacDowell Colony fellows